In Major League Baseball (MLB), records play an integral part in evaluating a player's impact on the sport. Holding a career record almost guarantees a player eventual entry into the Baseball Hall of Fame because it represents both longevity and consistency over a long period of time.  (For Japanese baseball records see Nippon Professional Baseball)

Batting records (1875–present)

Pitching records (1876–present)

Live-ball era (1920–present)

(if different from overall records)

Catcher records
Most runners caught stealing: 810, Gary Carter
Most stolen bases allowed: 1,498, Gary Carter
Most stolen base attempts: 2,308, Gary Carter
Highest caught stealing %: 57.40%, Roy Campanella
Most games caught: 2,427, Iván Rodríguez
Most caught no hitters: 4, Jason Varitek, May 19, 2008 and Carlos Ruiz, July 25, 2015.

Note: Pre-1950 stolen base data is incomplete; career leaders shown from 1950 to present.

Other records
Most World Series wins (as a manager): 7, Casey Stengel, Joe McCarthy
Most consecutive World Series wins (as a manager): 5, Casey Stengel
Most pennants won: 10, Casey Stengel, John McGraw
Most World Series appearances (as a manager): 10, Casey Stengel
Most World Series appearances (as a team): 40, New York Yankees
Most World Series titles (as a team): 27, New York Yankees
Most MVP Awards won: 7, Barry Bonds
Most consecutive games played: 2,632, Cal Ripken Jr.

See also

 List of Major League Baseball single-game records
 List of Major League Baseball single-season records
 List of Major League Baseball records considered unbreakable

Notes

References

External links
 All-time records at Baseball-Reference.com
 Unbreakable Baseball Records – slideshow by Life magazine

Record Holders